Southeast Polk Community School District, (often shortened to SEP, SE Polk)is a public school district located in suburban Des Moines and rural Polk County, Iowa, including the towns of Altoona, Mitchellville, Pleasant Hill, Runnells, and the surrounding rural areas. The district also stretches into small portions of Jasper and Marion Counties.

The district was formed by a consolidation of several districts (most notably Runnells, Altoona, and Mitchellville; several smaller districts also merged) in 1962.

The district is overseen by a seven-member Board of Education.

The superintendent of schools is Dirk Halupnik.

Schools
Southeast Polk operates 11 schools.

Elementary schools:
 Altoona Elementary, Altoona
 Centennial Elementary, Altoona
 Clay Elementary, Altoona
 Delaware Elementary, Des Moines
 Four Mile Elementary, Pleasant Hill
 Mitchellville Elementary, Mitchellville
 Runnells Elementary. Runnells
 Willowbrook Elementary, Altoona

Secondary Schools
 Spring Creek 6th Grade Center, Pleasant Hill
 Southeast Polk Junior High, Pleasant Hill
 Southeast Polk High School, Pleasant Hill

Southeast Polk is the 13th-largest school district in Iowa.

Mascot
The school mascot is the Ram. RAMS is an acronym for Runnells, Altoona, and Mitchellville, the district modified the "s" to represent the word "schools," but the original intent was for the mascot to represent the entire area covered by the school district. The school colors are black and gold. The district prides itself on its large amount of school spirit, including both "Ram Pride" and "The Southeast Polk Way."

Southeast Polk High School

Athletics
Southeast Polk is a member of the Central Iowa Metro League. The league is divided into two conferences, the Metro Conference and the Central Iowa Conference, with the latter being further subdivided into Northern, Eastern, and Western Divisions.

Notable alumni

Kyle Orton, former NFL quarterback.
Chris Pirillo, founder and former CEO of LockerGnome, Inc.
Zach Nunn, Member of the U.S. House of Representatives from Iowa's 3rd district

See also
List of school districts in Iowa
List of high schools in Iowa

External links
Official Site of School District

References

School districts in Iowa
Education in Polk County, Iowa
Schools in Polk County, Iowa
Iowa High School Athletic Association
School districts established in 1962
1962 establishments in Iowa